Kasun Vidura (born 6 October 1993) is a Sri Lankan cricketer. He made his first-class debut for Chilaw Marians Cricket Club in the 2012–13 Premier Trophy on 1 March 2013.

See also
 List of Chilaw Marians Cricket Club players

References

External links
 

1993 births
Living people
Sri Lankan cricketers
Chilaw Marians Cricket Club cricketers
People from Ragama